Mariana Duarte (born 5 October 1996) is a Brazilian female water polo player.

She was part of the Brazilian team at the  2015 World Aquatics Championships.
She participated at the 2016 Summer Olympics.

See also
 Brazil at the 2015 World Aquatics Championships
 Brazil at the 2019 Panamerican Games

References

External links

Mariana Duarte Photostream
Mariana Duarte Photos and Premium High Res Pictures - Getty Images

Brazilian female water polo players
Living people
Place of birth missing (living people)
1996 births
Olympic water polo players of Brazil
Water polo players at the 2016 Summer Olympics
Pan American Games medalists in water polo
Pan American Games bronze medalists for Brazil
Water polo players at the 2019 Pan American Games
Medalists at the 2019 Pan American Games
21st-century Brazilian women